The 2010 Silverstone GP2 Series round was a GP2 Series motor race held on July 10 and 11, 2010 at Silverstone Circuit in Silverstone, Britain. It was the fifth round of the 2010 GP2 Series. The race was used to support the 2010 British Grand Prix.

Report

Qualifying 
Jules Bianchi claimed pole for the Feature Race.

Feature Race
Pastor Maldonado extended his series lead with victory in the Silverstone Feature Race. The Rapax driver jumped polesitter Jules Bianchi (ART) at the start and never looked threatened from there on, gradually extending his advantage to win by 10.1 seconds. Bianchi was second ahead of Racing Engineering's Dani Clos, who came home a further 9.4s down the road. It was a largely processional affair through most of the field, with Bianchi's ART team-mate Sam Bird having an equally straightforward run to fourth, although Sergio Pérez and Christian Vietoris did their best to inject some interest with their scrap for fifth over the second half of the race. Addax driver Pérez finally found a way past the German Racing Engineering man with two laps to go, although sixth was still a good reward for Vietoris after starting from 12th on the grid. iSport's Davide Valsecchi and Oliver Turvey were able to mop up the remaining points when Addax's Giedo van der Garde made a mistake on the final lap while running fifth, allowing Valescchi to pass him immediately and Turvey to follow a couple of corners later to claim pole for the sprint race. Only two cars failed to make the finish, with Rapax's Luiz Razia pulling off the track midway through the race, and DAMS' Ho-Pin Tung retiring after several visits to the pits. Tung had started the race in a brand-new, unliveried chassis that was rushed through scrutineering this morning after destroying his race car in a trip over the kerbs during Friday practice.

Sprint Race
Sergio Pérez got his season back on track with a crushing win for Addax in the GP2 Series sprint race at Silverstone. The Mexican passed Davide Valsecchi and his iSport team-mate Oliver Turvey in the opening phase of the race and immediately left the rest of the field behind, routinely posting laps more than a second quicker than his rivals to finally cross the line with a margin of 15.7 seconds. Polesitter Turvey managed to hold on for second, earning himself his first GP2 main series podium. He had become the local crowd's only realistic hope of a home podium after ART's Sam Bird was prevented from taking the start by an engine failure on an installation lap. Turvey's result did not come easily. He saw off Valsecchi without difficulty, but soon found himself under pressure from Racing Engineering's Dani Clos, who had made good progress from sixth on the grid. The Spaniard launched several attacks but never managed to find a way through, and after seeing off a late challenge from Pastor Maldonado (Rapax), settled for third. Valsecchi, meanwhile, seemed to be struggling for pace and steadily dropped down the order, losing fifth to ART's Jules Bianchi at Abbey with a couple of laps remaining. He hung on to claim the final point for sixth.

Classification

Qualifying 

 Christian Vietoris, Alberto Valerio and Johnny Cecotto Jr. were penalized ten positions on the starting grid for causing collisions in the previous round's sprint.

Feature Race

Sprint Race

Standings after the round 

Drivers' Championship standings

Teams' Championship standings

 Note: Only the top five positions are included for both sets of standings.

See also 
 2010 British Grand Prix
 2010 Silverstone GP3 Series round

External links
https://archive.today/20100713005443/http://gp2series.com/Maldonado-crushes-competition-in.html
https://web.archive.org/web/20100714103520/http://gp2series.com/Perez-powers-to-sprint-win.html

Silverstone
Silverstone GP2 round